Courageous Blood is a 1913 silent film drama short directed by and starring Romaine Fielding. His costars were Mary Ryan and Robyn Adair. It was produced by the Lubin Manufacturing Company.

Cast
Romaine Fielding - Romanzo Fernandez
Mary Ryan - Mary Burke
Robyn Adair - Rock, a Rustler
Richard Wangermann - Colonel Gordon
Eleanor Mason - Colonel Gordon's Daughter
George Miller - The Deserter

References

External links
 Courageous Blood at IMDb.com

1913 films
American silent short films
American black-and-white films
Lubin Manufacturing Company films
Silent American drama films
1913 drama films
1913 short films
Films directed by Romaine Fielding
1910s American films